The Ministry of Labor, Social Affairs and Social Services (Misrad HaAvoda, HaRevaha VeHaSherutim HaHevrati'im) is the branch of government charged with overseeing employment and ensuring the welfare of the public in Israel and oversee the supply of services. The position is currently held by Ya'akov Margi.

History
The ministry was originally divided into two separate ministries – the Labor Ministry and the Welfare Ministry. In 1977 they were united to be the Welfare and Labor Ministry according to the view that labor can lead to welfare. In the term of the second government of Ariel Sharon (2003), the responsibility of work-related issues was transferred to the Industry, Trade and Labor ministry and in 2007 the name was changed to be Welfare and Social Services Ministry. In 2016 it was changed to the current name.

List of ministers

The Welfare and Social Services Minister of Israel (Sar HaAvoda HaRevaha) is the political head of the ministry and part of the Israeli cabinet.

Deputy ministers

References

External links
Ministry website 
All Ministers in the Ministry of Labor and Social Welfare Knesset website

Labor
Ministry of Labor
Labor
Social affairs ministries